This is a list of the 97 municipalities in the province of Jaén, in the autonomous community of Andalusia, Spain.

See also

Geography of Spain
List of cities in Spain

 
Jaen